Bythiospeum gloriae is a species of very small aquatic snail, an operculate gastropod mollusc in the family Hydrobiidae.

References

Hydrobiidae
Bythiospeum
Gastropods described in 2003